Amy Hennig (born August 19, 1964) is an American video game director and script writer, formerly for the video game company Naughty Dog. She began her work in the industry on the Nintendo Entertainment System, with her design debut on the Super Nintendo Entertainment System game Michael Jordan: Chaos in the Windy City. She later went to work for Crystal Dynamics, working primarily on the Legacy of Kain series (which she considers her greatest achievement). With Naughty Dog, she worked primarily on the Jak and Daxter and Uncharted series.

Hennig believes that the creative direction of a script holds more importance than the graphics of the game. She has been called one of the most influential women in the video game industry by Edge magazine.

Life
Hennig graduated from University of California, Berkeley with a bachelor's degree in English literature. She went on to the film school at San Francisco State University, when she was hired as an artist for an Atari game called ElectroCop. Her work on the game made her realize that the video game industry interested her more than the film industry; she dropped out of film school soon after. Hennig has said that her literature degree and film studies have helped her work: "Everything I learned as an undergraduate with English literature and in film school about editing and shots and the language of film has come into play, but in a way I couldn't possibly have planned."

Career

Hennig has worked in the video game industry since the late 1980s. Most of her early jobs involved games on the Nintendo Entertainment System, where she was primarily employed as an artist and animator. Her first job was as a freelance artist for Electrocop, an unreleased Atari 7800 game, based on the Atari Lynx launch title. Afterwards she joined Electronic Arts as an animator and artist, doing work on an unreleased title, Bard's Tale 4, and Desert Strike. She later moved to designing and directing video games.

Two years after being hired at Electronic Arts, Hennig worked as an artist on Michael Jordan: Chaos in the Windy City. However, when the lead designer quit, Hennig landed the job. In the late 1990s, she moved to Crystal Dynamics, where she assisted Silicon Knights in the development of Blood Omen: Legacy of Kain. Later, she acted as the director, producer, and writer for Legacy of Kain: Soul Reaver. She also directed and wrote Soul Reaver 2 and Legacy of Kain: Defiance.

Hennig departed Crystal Dynamics to act as the creative director for Naughty Dog. She contributed to the Jak and Daxter series before working as the game director for Uncharted: Drake's Fortune, and as head writer and creative director for the Uncharted series. With Uncharted 2: Among Thieves, Hennig led the 150-person team who created the game, as well as acting as writer. After directing and writing for Uncharted 3: Drake's Deception and beginning work on Uncharted 4: A Thief's End for the PlayStation 4, Hennig left Naughty Dog in 2014.

On April 3, 2014, Hennig joined Visceral Games with Todd Stashwick to work on Project Ragtag, a Star Wars game. It was reported on October 17, 2017, that EA was shutting down Visceral Games and that their Star Wars project was delayed and moved to another studio to allow for "significant change". A representative of EA told Polygon that EA are "in discussions with Amy about her next move". Hennig announced the following June that she had left EA in January and started a small studio to explore options involving virtual reality games.

Hennig announced she joined Skydance Media in November 2019 to start a new division there, Skydance New Media, for "new story-focused experiences [that] will employ state-of-the-art computer graphics to provide the visual fidelity of television and film, but with an active, lean-in experience that puts the audience in the driver's seat". Stashwick said in May 2021 that he was working with Hennig on an action-adventure game; in September, this was revealed to be Forspoken. Hennig and Stashwick are part of the writing team alongside Gary Whitta and Allison Rymer.

Skydance New Media later announced in October 2021 that it was working with Marvel Entertainment to produce a new action-adventure game that will take place in the Marvel Universe.

In April 2022, Skydance New Media and Lucasfilm Games announced they are working on a narrative-driven, action-adventure game "featuring an original story in the Star Wars galaxy," with Hennig at the helm.

Writing style
Hennig believes the term "platformer" is outdated and misused with many modern games, preferring a different term like "traversal" for some. She also feels that focusing too much on graphics can inhibit a game, saying that once game writers focus on creative expression, video games will greatly improve.

She often uses supporting characters to highlight personality aspects of other characters through interactions within the script. For example, Chloe Frazer acts as a foil for Nathan Drake, highlighting the darker aspects of his personality and past. With her work in the Uncharted series, Hennig described the writing and plot as on the "bleeding edge" of the genre of cinematic video games. She has won two Writers Guild of America Video Game Writing Awards in addition to several other awards for her work on Uncharted 2 and Uncharted 3.

Influence and legacy
Hennig has been cited as an example of a successful woman in a historically male dominated industry, and of how women are taking more important roles within it. Hennig herself says that she has not encountered sexism in the industry, but that differing perspective from men in the industry has helped on some occasions. The UK video magazine Edge named her one of the 100 most influential women in the game industry.

Hennig was given a BAFTA Special Award in June 2016. She received the Lifetime Achievement award at the Game Developers Choice Awards in March 2019.

Works

References

External links

1964 births
Atari people
Game Developers Conference Lifetime Achievement Award recipients
Living people
American video game designers
American video game directors
American women writers
Legacy of Kain
Naughty Dog people
Sony Interactive Entertainment people
Square Enix people
Skydance Media people
Place of birth missing (living people)
San Francisco State University alumni
Jak and Daxter
Uncharted
University of California, Berkeley alumni
Video game artists
Video game writers
Women video game designers
Women video game developers
BAFTA winners (people)
Electronic literature writers